Arborville is an unincorporated community in York County, Nebraska, United States.

History
A post office was established at Arborville in 1874, and remained in 1943. Arborville was named from the trees planted by its founder.

References

Unincorporated communities in York County, Nebraska
Unincorporated communities in Nebraska